The Punters Club was a pub and live music venue located on Brunswick Street, Fitzroy, in inner Melbourne, Victoria, Australia.

It developed a reputation as one of the city's premier live music venues, drawing comparisons to the likes of New York's CBGB. It was also noted for its rough, alternative, yet casual atmosphere with audiences sometimes sitting on the floor while watching bands.

History
The Punters Club was started in 1987 with the taking over, renaming, and renovation of the Moonee Valley Hotel as a live-music venue, by Rob Guerini and Ric DiPietro. It played a broad and eclectic range of music, such as indie rock, electronica, nu country, lo-fi, metal, Celtic and ska. The venue helped launch the careers of a number of successful Australian bands, including Frente!, Magic Dirt, Something for Kate, Spiderbait and You Am I.

Rob loved footy, and in the early years it was a Saturday afternoon ritual to have a few beers listening to the footy on the wireless, whilst being entertained by Stanley Paulzin's razor sharp banter.

Nino from local legends The Bo-Weevils lived above the pub, and was always generous with the Mexican cabbage, which was a laneway must.

Mat Everett took over the Club in 1993 and operated it for the remainder of its life.

From 1995, the Punters Club nurtured a close relationship with local purveyors of live electronic music, such as IF? Records (with their Zoetrope (sessions)  and Clan Analogue, and regularly played host to live acts like Zen Paradox, Little Nobody, Artificial, Andrez Bergen, Voiteck, TR-Storm, Blimp, Son Of Zev, Isnod, Soulenoid, Guyver 3, Frontside, Half Yellow, and Honeysmack.

During the late 1990s Brunswick Street began to change, with a number of more mainstream establishments replacing what had been a much more alternative area. This resulted in a significant increase in property rents all along the strip, and when the Punters Club's lease came up for renewal in 2002, Everett saw continuing as unsustainable. The club closed its doors on 17 February 2002, with a twelve-hour music marathon that featured Gaslight Radio, Rocket Science, Pre-Shrunk, TISM and The Beat End Profilers.

The venue later became a pizza bar, Bimbo Deluxe. After a two-year hunt for another venue, Everett bought the Commercial Hotel in High Street, Northcote—an area that was developing a similar atmosphere to that of Brunswick Street in the 1980s. In late 2004 he reopened the venue as the Northcote Social Club, which maintains a very similar nature, bands and clientele to that of the Punters Club.

Melbourne band The Lucksmiths wrote a song entitled "Requiem for the Punters Club" as a tribute to the venue.

On 27 and 28 November 2010, Punters Club reunion gigs were held at the Corner Hotel in Melbourne, featuring bands such as Spiderbait, Hoss, Guttersnipes, The Glory Box, Frente!, The Fauves and The Hollowmen(1).

Bands
Some of the bands who played at the Punters Club included:

 The 5.6.7.8's
 Alcotomic
 Anaphase
 Arab Strap
 Architecture in Helsinki
 Augie March
 The Avalanches
 Black Rose
 The Bo-Weevils
 Blueline Medic
 Bughouse
 By Ferry Or Steamer
 The Cannanes
 Cat Power
 The Chalk Circle
 Clowns of Decadence
 The Colonial V-Knees
 Dallas Crane
 Dan and Al (Dan Warner and Al McInnes)
 Dave Graney and The Coral Snakes
 Dirty Three
 DJ Spooky
 Ephedrine
 Even
 The Fauves
 Fireballs
 Frente!
 The Frying Dutchman
 Gaslight Radio
 Gersey
The Great Elevator
 The Happy Sumo
 Hugo Race & The True Spirit
 Jimmy Eat World
 Jon Spencer Blues Explosion
 Kim Salmon, Kim Salmon & The Surrealists
 The Lucksmiths
 Maelstrom
 Man in the Wood
 Meloncholiflowers
 Mike Patton
 Minimum Chips
 Mr Floppy
 Negativland
 Ninetynine
 Nitocris
 The Paradise Motel
 Penthouse Paupers
 Portraits of Hugo Perez
 Powderfinger

 Powder Monkeys
 Pray TV
 Regurgitator
 RPN
 Roaring Jack
 Rocket Science
 The Rococo Pops
 Sam Prekop
 Sandpit
 Scanner
 Sea Scouts
 Sea Stories
 Seven
 Sforzando
 Smudge
 Snout
 Something for Kate
 Sick Puppies
 Silverchair
 Spiderbait
 Snog
 Snuff Puppets
 Tiddas
 TISM
 Tlot Tlot
 Two Guys From Kabul
 Underground Lovers
 Weddings Parties Anything
 Chris Wilson
 Various Clan Analogue members
 Little Nobody
 Ollie Olsen
 Zen Paradox
 Isnod
 Voiteck
 Frontside
 The LN Elektronisch Ensemble
 Schlock Tactile
 Son Of Zev
 Tee-Art
 The Make-Up
 Honeysmack
 Guyver 3
 Soulenoid
 Andrez Bergen
 Josh Abrahams
 Wild Pumpkins at Midnight
 Thanks for Coming

References

External links
Punters Club website (at archive.org)

Pubs in Melbourne
Hotel buildings completed in 1987
Hotels established in 1987
1987 establishments in Australia
Fitzroy, Victoria
Buildings and structures in the City of Yarra